The sand frog (Heleioporus psammophilus)  is a species of frog in the family Myobatrachidae.
It is endemic to southern Western Australia.
Its natural habitats are temperate forests, temperate shrubland, Mediterranean-type shrubby vegetation, shrub-dominated wetlands, swamps, intermittent freshwater lakes, and intermittent freshwater marshes.

References

Heleioporus
Amphibians of Western Australia
Amphibians described in 1954
Taxonomy articles created by Polbot
Frogs of Australia